Farinaz Lari (born March 21, 1987) is an Iranian kickboxer. She was the first Iranian woman to win the World Kickboxing Championships. She is currently the 52 kg World Number Five ranked contender in K-1 Rules WAKO as of November 2017.

Achievements 

 Sport Accord World Combat Games 2013 Bronze Medalist (-52 kg)

World Combat Games 2013

 World Kickboxing Championships 2013 (WAKO) -52 kg, Gold medalist
 Asian Kickboxing Championships (WAKO) India, Silver medalist (2012) -52 kg
 Member of Kickboxing Women committee, (WAKO) 2011

Wako Women Committee

 Kickboxing World Cup Diamond -52 kg (2011), Gold medalist
 3rd Asian Indoor Games Kickboxing championships -52 kg (2009), Silver Medalist

3rd Asian Indoor Games 2009

 Winner of professional fight versus Thailand -51 kg (2008)
 National Youth Gymnastics Championships (1998) Gold Medalist
 National Kickboxing Championships -48 kg Gold Medalist (2006)
 Provençal Kickboxing Championships -48 kg Bronze Medalist (2007)
 National Kickboxing Championships -48 kg Gold Medalist (2007)
 National Muaythai Championships -51 kg Gold Medalist (2008)
 Member of Iran Muaythai National Team (2008)
 Member of Iran Kickboxing National Team (2009–2013)

External links 

 Farinaz Lari Awakening Profile

References 

1987 births
Living people
Iranian female kickboxers
Iranian expatriates in Canada
Iranian Muay Thai practitioners